Cala Galdana (Galdana cove) is a coastal resort in Menorca, 9 km south of Ferreries. The cove was largely undeveloped until the 1960s.

References

Populated places in Menorca